Guanshan may refer to:

Guanshan Subdistrict, a part of Hongshan District, Wuhan, Hubei, China
Guanshan Village in Xiangzikou, Ningxiang Prefecture, Hunan
Guanshan, Taitung, an urban township in Taiwan
Guanshan Waterfront Park, a park in Guanshan, Taitung, Taiwan
Guanshan Riverside Park, a park along the Keelung River in Songshan, Taipei, Taiwan